Deborah Kirsty Bruwer (née Flood; born 27 February 1980) is an English rower, noteworthy for winning silver medals in the quadruple sculls at both the 2004 and 2008 Olympic Games.

Biography
Flood was born in Harrogate, Yorkshire, and was a Great Britain junior judo international and a county level 1500m and cross–country runner and shot–putter before she took up rowing.

She won a bronze medal at the 1998 World Junior championships in the double sculls along with partner Frances Houghton. The following year they both won gold in the double sculls at the World Under 23 Championships.

In 2000 Flood won gold in the single sculls at the World Under 23 Championships and the single sculls national title rowing for the Tideway Scullers School at the 2000 National Championships.

At the 2006 World Championships, Flood originally finished in the silver medal position in the quadruple sculls, but was elevated to gold after one of the Russian crew failed a drugs test.

Having taken a year off in 2009, Flood returned to take World Championships gold again in 2010, in the quad sculls with Beth Rodford, Frances Houghton, and Annabel Vernon.

At the 2012 Summer Olympics Flood competed in the GB quad scull with Beth Rodford, Frances Houghton, and Melanie Wilson and finished in fifth place.

In December 2012 Flood was elected captain of Leander Club, the first time a woman had been appointed to this role in almost 200 years. 

Debbie is a Christian and works for Christians in Sport.

References

External links 

 Profile at Team GB (2008 Beijing Olympic Games)

1980 births
English female rowers
Living people
Olympic rowers of Great Britain
Sportspeople from Harrogate
Rowers at the 2004 Summer Olympics
Rowers at the 2008 Summer Olympics
Rowers at the 2012 Summer Olympics
Olympic silver medallists for Great Britain
Olympic medalists in rowing
Medalists at the 2008 Summer Olympics
Medalists at the 2004 Summer Olympics
Members of Leander Club
World Rowing Championships medalists for Great Britain
Stewards of Henley Royal Regatta